The I'm with You World Tour was a worldwide concert tour by American rock band, the Red Hot Chili Peppers in support of the band's tenth studio album, I'm with You. It marked the band's first tour in four years and first with guitarist Josh Klinghoffer, who replaced John Frusciante in 2009. The band was also joined for the first time by backing musicians Mauro Refosco (percussion) and Chris Warren (keyboards). The first North American leg of the tour was briefly postponed due to a leg injury sustained by singer Anthony Kiedis which required surgery. Klinghoffer also broke his foot during the tour; however, no dates were cancelled due to his injury. During the tour the band saw a few milestones come and go such as their own 30th anniversary since forming in 1983 and the 10th, 20th and 25th anniversaries of their albums, By the Way, Blood Sugar Sex Magik and The Uplift Mofo Party Plan. Despite these milestones, the band made little to no mention of them and no special performances were given on their behalf. The band was also named 2012 inductees to the Rock and Roll Hall of Fame while on tour.

The tour ranked 15th on Billboards "Top 25 Tours" list of 2012, earning over $30 million from its 42 shows. Additionally, the tour placed 10th on Pollstar's 2012 "Top 50 Worldwide Tours", earning nearly $60 million.

Background
Before the tour commenced, the band played several one-off shows and music festivals; including the Summer Sonic Festival. During an interview with Rolling Stone, frontman Anthony Kiedis stated they were in rehearsals for an extensive world tour. He said, "I know when we write mediocre stuff, and when we write good stuff. I can't wait to go out and play this". There was also hope among fans that the band would again perform songs from 1995's One Hot Minute. "Pea", a song written and sung by Flea, has been the only song from the album performed live since 1997. When Frusciante returned to the band in 1998 he felt uneasy to play those songs, so the band never considered performing them. However, Kiedis announced during a pre-tour interview that nothing from One Hot Minute would be performed. He stated that it was not that he did not like those songs and there were a few that he highly valued; however, he felt those songs did not fit the vibe of current setlists they had planned. Kiedis was asked about performing songs from the album and although he stated he liked the songs from the album, citing "Aeroplane" as a favorite, Kiedis said the music did not fit with the vision he had for the tour's setlists.

The tour was officially announced in July 2011, while the band was on a promotional tour for the record. Sound engineer, Dave Rat said the tour will last into 2013 and the band's schedule will be spent 3 weeks on the road and 2 weeks off throughout the tour, a plan they have followed on previous tours. For the world tour, the band added percussionist Mauro Refosco and Chris Warren, their drum tech, to play keyboards. During the promo tour, the band filmed a second version (the band didn't agree with the original version) of the music video for The Adventures of Rain Dance Maggie, the album's first single on a rooftop in Venice Beach. The band performed various songs in between takes for the onlookers below. Upon album release, the band performed a concert in Cologne, Germany; where the group played the entire album in sequence minus one song. Deemed, "Red Hot Chili Peppers Live: I'm With You", the concert was streamed via satellite into movie theaters in various parts of the world including Europe and North America.

The tour began in September 2011 at the Simón Bolívar Park in Bogotá, Colombia. The shows in Chile, Brazil, Peru, Argentina marked the band's first shows in South America in nine years. The band finished out 2011 with shows in Europe. As the North American leg of the tour approached frontman Kiedis sustained a foot injury. Dates were postponed and later rescheduled. In April 2012 the band was inducted into the Rock and Roll Hall of Fame where they performed a few songs and were joined by former drummers Jack Irons and Cliff Martinez on "Give It Away" marking the first time the two drummers had performed with the band since their departures in the 1980s. The day following the ceremony, the band played a free show at the House of Blues for Obama reelection volunteers. During the concerts in Florida, the band wore hoodies in support of the Trayvon Martin case. The band was joined onstage by Jack Irons and Cliff Martinez during the encore of their August 12, 2012 show at Staples Center just like they were at the hall of fame induction performance earlier in the year for a performance of "Give It Away". Josh Klinghoffer broke his foot during the band's August 14, 2012 show. The following night he was in a walking boot. Klinghoffer used a chair when needed on stage to get through the performances until his foot was properly healed. No dates were cancelled or postponed due to his injury. Chad Smith said Klinghoffer's injury would not have any effect on the tour and joked he actually plays better since hurting his foot. It was around this time during the summer of 2012 tour dates that Klinghoffer began to tease various songs from the band's back catalog, many of which haven not been played in years, such as "My Friends", or ever before such as "Gong Li" and "Long Progression", an outtake from I'm with You. Most teases occurred prior to the performance of "Under the Bridge".

During the tour in October, Flea celebrated his 50th birthday by holding an event celebrating his life and his work of giving back to the community. The event was held in his backyard and was part birthday bash, part fundraiser for his nonprofit school, Silverlake Conservatory of Music. The Chili Peppers performed a rare acoustic set featuring some songs from the band's catalog performed acoustically for the first time ever while Rancid and Ben Harper also performed at the event. In late October 2012, the band appeared on Nigel Godrich's show, From the Basement where they were said to have performed the entire album and according to Chad Smith, "Even You Brutus?" was performed for the first time ever making it the last of the songs from the current album to be performed live. According to Smith, the show was filmed in 3D. The show was released online in late 2012; however, a full performance was not released and "Even You Brutus?" was again absent.

The band dedicated their 2013 shows in Australia to the anti-whaling movement called Sea Shepherd Conservation Society, a group devoted to prevent the killing of whales. The band incorporated Sea Shepherd visuals into their performance and featured a stall at each of the venues to provide festival goers with information about the group's campaigns, which include anti-whaling missions and marine conservation. The band also started to perform a full version of David Bowie's "What in the World", during their 2013 dates.

It was announced in October 2012 by Chad Smith that the tour would officially come to an end in April 2013. In early 2013, Smith further confirmed that the tour would end with two dates at the Coachella Valley Music and Arts Festival on April 14 and April 21, 2013. Smith stated on his Twitter page "Will be Our 3rd time playing Coachella festival this April...nice way to end up our IWY tour". Following a brief break after the tour, the band will perform at a few U.S. festivals in the summer with Flea and touring percussionist, Mauro Refosco touring with their side-project, Atoms for Peace in late 2013. When asked in March 2013 about the band's next album, Smith said they plan to start writing new music in September 2013.

Tour overview
The band performed a total of fifty songs from their catalog of music along with numerous teases of older classics and cover songs mostly performed by Klinghoffer as intros to other songs. The setlists were made up of many of the band's biggest hits with songs from their current album along with their previous three albums and 1991's Blood Sugar Sex Magik being the main focus of the setlists, which were always written by Kiedis. "Freaky Styley", "Me and My Friends", "Higher Ground" and "Fire" were the only songs from the band's 1980s albums to be performed. "Hard to Concentrate" from Stadium Arcadium was debuted on October 14, 2011. Halfway into the tour, Klinghoffer began to tease various songs from the band's catalog as intros to other songs. Many of the teased songs have not been performed in their entirety in years, some never performed. As with every tour dating back to 1999, "Pea" remained the lone song from the band's 1995 album, One Hot Minute to be performed. Almost every show (with the exception of some early dates) opened with "Monarchy of Roses" while each encore opened up with a drum and percussion jam by Chad Smith, Mauro Refosco and sometimes Josh Klinghoffer while "Give it Away" followed by a lengthy jam would close out the shows, which normally lasted slightly under two hours and usually around 16 to 18 songs performed.

This tour marked the last time "Annie Wants a Baby", "Brendan's Death Song", "Dance, Dance, Dance", "Goodbye Hooray" and "Police Station" were performed live. It was also marked their first performances in several different countries, including: Bulgaria, Colombia, Ukraine, South Africa, Estonia, Latvia, Lithuania, Greece, Turkey, Croatia, Guatemala, Israel, Lebanon, Peru, Romania and Paraguay.

Songs performed

Originals

Cover songs (performed as intros/jams/teases unless noted)

Tour dates

Festivals and other miscellaneous performances

Cancellations and rescheduled shows

Box office score data

Opening acts

Foals (South America) (Europe—Leg 1, select dates)
Femi Kuti & The Positive Force (Europe—Leg 1)
Fool's Gold (Europe—Leg 1, select dates)
The Vaccines (Europe—Leg 2, select dates)
Sleigh Bells (North America—Leg 1, select dates)
Little Dragon (North America—Leg 1, select dates)
Santigold (North America—Leg 1, select dates)
Band of Skulls (North America—Leg 2, select dates)
Janelle Monáe (North America—Leg 2, select dates)

Thundercat (North America—Leg 3, select dates)
Rebirth Brass Band (North America—Leg 2, select dates)
Son Batá (Bogotá)
Chancho en Piedra (Santiago)
Reverend and The Makers (Knebworth, Sunderland)
The Wombats (Knebworth, Sunderland)
Dizzee Rascal (Knebworth)
The Futureheads (Sunderland)
Noel Gallagher's High Flying Birds (Dublin)
Tinariwen (Nijmegen, Paris)

Gogol Bordello (Moscow)
Off! (Los Angeles—August 12) (Auckland) (April 9, 2013 – Los Angeles)
Triggerfinger (Nijmegen)
2Cellos (Zagreb)
Grimus (Bucharest)
Athena (Istanbul)
Riff Cohen (Tel Aviv)
Gary Clark Jr. (Auckland)
Die Antwoord (Johannesburg, Cape Town)

Broadcasts and recordings

Prior to the world tour and the date following the album's release the band gave a special full album performance (although minus one song) which was shown via-satellite throughout the world in movie theaters.

In November 2011, the band opened the website, LiveChiliPeppers.com which will feature live recordings of every full show from the band's tour beginning with the November 7, 2011 show for purchase. The shows are available in MP3 for $9.95 and ALAC and FLAC for $12.95. All shows will be available for pre-order and will be released 72 hours after the completion of each show. On March 29, 2012, the band released 2011 Live EP, a free five song MP3 download available only through their website. The performances on the EP, which were taken from the November 2011 European leg of the tour, were personally selected by Chad Smith. On July 1, 2014, 2012-13 Live EP was released for free through the band's website with another five songs selected by Smith.

Critical reception
Robert Heller (Bloomberg Businessweek) was not pleased with the  concert at The O2 Arena, giving the show one-and-one-half stars. He says, "Unfortunately, there's little flesh to these workouts. As anyone who has waded through 2006's 'Stadium Arcadium' album (only to realize there is a whole, full-length, second CD still to go) will attest, the song craft has its limitations.  Too many numbers are structured with the sophistication of a toddler's Lego effort. The punch of the playing flabbily dissipates into the vast space of the O2.  A few songs, clustered at the end of the gig, buck the trend. A cover of Stevie Wonder's 'Higher Ground' thrashes with tension. The classic L.A. rock of 'Californication' soars, if not quite like the Eagles, then at least like a well-fed vulture. 'By the Way' is explosive. It isn’t quite enough".

While Jim Abbott (Orlando Sentinel) poked fun at the band's age, he gave a modest review of the show at the Amway Center. He comments, "On the opening 'Monarchy of Roses', the band overpowered the singing, with volume shifting wildly in a harsh sound mix. Fortunately, there was the other aspect of the band's concert appeal: a stage with mammoth vertical spotlight towers and a huge video screen to project hypnotic shapes, constellations and other diversions. It's hard to process that the band is among this year's inductees into the Rock and Roll Hall of Fame, an honor at which the group might’ve once thumbed its nose. With the shock of that milestone comes the realization that anyone around for almost 30 years has amassed a formidable catalog of songs".

For the show at the Air Canada Centre, Ben Rayner (Toronto Star) alluded to the band being "lucky". He says, "The Peppers are lucky enough, too, to court not one, but two, stubbornly faithful audiences through their middle years. Both crowds received a tip of the hat at the ACC on Friday, although the set list had a definite tilt toward the far more mannered and ordinary Peppers of recent memory". Scott Mervis (Pittsburgh Post-Gazette) gave the show at the Consol Energy Center a positive review, stating Flea was the highlight of the entire show. He continues, "From the moment they hit the stage, with the first of many mini-jam sessions, the Peppers were an instrumental powerhouse. They are essentially a funk power trio led by Flea, who, at 49, is still a rock 'n' roll animal unleashed on the stage. His bass was cranked to max volume and was the dominant instrument throughout the show, as it should be".

Despite the Value City Arena being half-filled, Kevin Joy (The Columbus Dispatch) felt the show was just as energetic as a stadium. He states, "Although their punkish, low-rent origins are long gone, the group's songs continue to share a connected — albeit mellowed — sensibility that recalls a distinct time and place. A high-tech video wall that spanned the stage as well as hanging screens reinforced the status upgrade resulting from 30-plus years in the business". Another glowing review came from Garin Pirnia (The Cincinnati Enquirer). She writes, "RHCP is a band that handles stadiums well, but it made me yearn to see them at a club show. They’re entertaining in any context, but sharing these moments with 20,000 people that could easily translate into a more-intimate club setting made me feel slightly disconnected. Bono's basically untouchable, but Flea and the guys seem like regular folks. How fun would it be to share a beer with them after a show"?

Kevin C. Johnson St. Louis Post-Dispatch felt the show at the Scottrade Center cemented the band's place in rock history. He explains, "After 'Give It Away', which spiraled into a long instrumental featuring everyone but Kiedis, Flea (who at one point walked across the stage on his hands) thanked the crowd for 30 years of love, warmth and encouragement. He made a plea to fans to continue to always support live music. The action was captured not only on a gargantuan video that spread across the width of the stage, but eight smaller screens that moved around and at one point stretched out like a series of accordions".

Fandemonium

In November 2014 the band released the book, Fandemonium. During the tour, Kiedis went to photographer David Mushegain and asked him to photograph and interview the band's fans at each concert throughout the world tour. The book features photographs and interviews conducted by Mushegain with fans of all ages throughout the world.

Personnel

Flea – bass, backing vocals, piano
Anthony Kiedis – lead vocals
Josh Klinghoffer – guitar, backing vocals, six-string bass, drums/percussion, banjo
Chad Smith – drums, percussion

Additional musicians
Mauro Refosco – percussion
Chris Warren – keyboards

Guest musicians
 Keith "Tree" Barry – saxophone (11/21/11 marked Barry's first performance with the band in 21 years. Barry performed on "Did I Let You Know")
Michael Bulger – trumpet, piano (Teacher at Flea's Silverlake school. Performed with the band at a few warm up dates including the August 30, 2011 full album show)
Femi Kuti – saxophone (Joined band onstage during their encore performance of "Give It Away" and "Did I Let You Know" [Stockholm Only])
Toots Hibbert – vocals (Performed with the band on their cover of "Louie Louie" at 2011 New Year's Eve show)
Brandon Westgate – saxophone (Member of Fool's Gold. Performed with the band on "Did I Let You Know")
Jack Irons – drums (band's original drummer joined them on "Give It Away" at HOF inductions and on August 12, 2012)
Cliff Martinez – drums (band's second drummer joined them on "Give It Away" at HOF inductions and on August 12, 2012)
2Cellos (joined the band on "Californication" during their August 29, 2012 show)
İlhan Erşahin – saxophone (joined the band for their performance of "Did I Let You Know" during their September 8, 2012 show and in Rio de Janeiro, September 11, 2013)
Avishai Cohen – trumpet (joined the band for their performance of "The Power of Equality" during their September 10, 2012 show)
Thundercat – (opening act joined band for "Give it Away" during November 1, 2012 show)
Chad – (trumpet player for Rebirth Brass Band joined the band for "Did I Let You Know" during November 17, 2012 show)

Notes 
1.Data is gathered from concerts (and non-festival shows) held between November 9, 2011 through November 13, 2012. 
2.Data is gathered from concerts (and non-festival shows) held between January 1, 2012 through December 31, 2012.

External links
Red Hot Chili Peppers website

References

Red Hot Chili Peppers concert tours
2011 concert tours
2012 concert tours
2013 concert tours